WNL may refer to:
 Women's National League (Ireland), in association football 
 WNL (broadcaster), a Dutch public broadcasting association
 Within normal limits, an acronym used in medicine